Hushdan (also Romanized as Hūshdān and Hooshdan; also known as Chāhrū) is a village in Gabrik Rural District, in the Central District of Jask County, Hormozgan Province, Iran. At the 2006 census, its population was 248, in 43 families.

References 

Populated places in Jask County